San Paolo Solbrito is a comune (municipality) in the Province of Asti in the Italian region Piedmont, located about  southeast of Turin and about  northwest of Asti.

San Paolo Solbrito borders the following municipalities: Dusino San Michele, Montafia, Roatto, Villafranca d'Asti, and Villanova d'Asti.

Demographic evolution

References

Cities and towns in Piedmont